The Great Divide is the sixth full-length album by The Generators. Released in 2007 by People Like You in Europe & Japan. Recorded throughout June–December 2006 at The Mouse House in Altadena, Ca. by Rich Mouser. "The Point of No Return" was released as the only single and video from the album.

Track listing
All songs by Dagger/Doosky unless otherwise noted.

 "The Great Divide" (Dagger/Johnson/Doosky)
 "My Best Regards" (Dagger/Johnson/Doosky)
 "I Stand In Doubt"
 "So Many Miles"
 "In My Oblivion"
 "Point of No Return"
 "A Turn For the Worse" (Dagger/Doosky/Danny Damned)
 "Paint It Black" (Jagger/Richards)
 "What I've Become" (Dagger/Hahn)
 "I'm Still Believing"

Credits
Doug Dagger – lead vocals
Sir Doosky – lead and rhythm guitars, backing vocals
Ace Von Johnson - lead and rhythm guitars, backing vocals
Teddy Hahn - bass
Dirty Ernie – drums, backing vocals on "The Great Divide", "My Best Regards", "Paint It Black", and "What I've Become"
Mando Del-Rio - drums on "I Stand In Doubt", "So Many Miles", "In My Oblivion", "Point of No Return", "A Turn For the Worse", and "I'm Still Believing"

Additional musicians 
Rich Mouser – Hammond Organ

The Generators albums
2007 albums